Mancelona Public Schools is a school district headquartered in Mancelona, Michigan.

 the district has 945 students, with 100 in early childhood programs. The district has  of area. Traverse Bay Area Intermediate School District (TBAISD) serves the district.

Schools
 Mancelona High School
 The current building opened in 1999.
 Mancelona Middle School
 A renovation occurred in 2000.
 Mancelona Elementary School
 A renovation occurred in 1998.

References

External links
 Mancelona Public Schools
School districts in Michigan
Education in Antrim County, Michigan